Kristian Näkyvä (born 18 November 1990) is a Finnish professional ice hockey defenceman who currently plays for Örebro HK of the Swedish Hockey League (SHL).

Playing career
Undrafted, Näkyvä played as a youth within the Espoo Blues organization. He made his professional debut in the 2008–09 with the Blues with 2 assists in 6 games. After three seasons with the Blues, Näkyvä signed with rivals JYP in search of regular playing time at the Liiga level on 18 May 2011.

Näkyvä established himself within the blueline of JYP and after three seasons in which he won a Championship in 2012 and found a place in the international squad he opted to leave his native Finland and signed a three-year contract with Luleå HF of the Swedish Hockey League on 9 June 2014. In his debut season in Sweden in the 2014–15 season, Näkyvä was an instant success in co-leading the league in goals from the blueline with 10 and finishing 5th in scoring with 29 points.

Näkyvä performances gained NHL interest and after just one season with Luleå, he cut short his contract with the club to sign a one-year entry-level contract with the Nashville Predators on 24 April 2015. In the 2015–16 season, Näkyvä was assigned to the American Hockey League with affiliate, the Milwaukee Admirals. Unable to earn a recall to the Predators,  Näkyvä appeared in 69 games for 10 points.

On 18 May 2016, Näkyvä opted to leave the Predators organization after one season to return to Sweden in signing a two-year contract with Linköping HC of the SHL.

Career statistics

Regular season and playoffs

International

References

External links

1990 births
Living people
Espoo Blues players
Finnish ice hockey defencemen
JYP Jyväskylä players
Kiekko-Vantaa players
Linköping HC players
Luleå HF players
Milwaukee Admirals players
TuTo players
Örebro HK players
Ice hockey people from Helsinki